The year 1935 in architecture involved some significant architectural events and new buildings.

Events
 May 29 – Compagnie Générale Transatlantique ocean liner , with Art Déco and Streamline Moderne interiors designed under the supervision of Roger-Henri Expert, begins her maiden voyage.

Buildings and structures

Buildings opened
 June 2 – Saint Constantine and Elena Cathedral, Bălți, Moldova.
 July 6 – New building for Museum Boijmans, Rotterdam, by Ad van der Steur.
 July 13 – Shoreham Airport terminal building in England, by Stavers Tiltman.
 July 22 – Odeon, Kingstanding cinema in Birmingham, England, by Harry Weedon and Cecil Clavering.
 August 3 – Church of the Good Shepherd, Lake Tekapo, South Island of New Zealand, by Richard Strachan De Renzy Harman after Esther Hope, is consecrated.
 August 5 – Eastbourne Bandstand in Eastbourne, England.
 September 30 – Boulder Dam, by John L. Savage (design engineer) with Gordon Kaufmann (supervising architect), is dedicated.
 November 4 – Hornsey Town Hall, London, by Reginald Uren.
 November 5 – Faringdon Folly tower, England, by Lord Gerald Wellesley for Lord Berners.
 November 18
 Freedom Monument in Riga, Latvia, by Kārlis Zāle, is unveiled.
 Opelwerk Brandenburg, Germany, begins production, 190 days after the laying of the foundation stone.

Buildings completed

 Fallingwater in southwestern Pennsylvania, designed by Frank Lloyd Wright
 Florya Atatürk Marine Mansion, Istanbul, designed by Seyfi Arkan and gifted to Mustafa Kemal Atatürk
 Highpoint I apartment block, Highgate, north London, by Berthold Lubetkin with structural design by Ove Arup
 De La Warr Pavilion, Bexhill-on-Sea, England, by Erich Mendelsohn and Serge Chermayeff
 Supreme Court of the United States by Cass Gilbert, completed posthumously
 Von Sternberg House, Northridge, California, by Richard Neutra
 Stern House, Houghton Estate, Johannesburg, South Africa, by Rex Distin Martienssen and partners
 Villa Necchi Campiglio, Milan, by Piero Portaluppi
 Stockholm Collective House by Sven Markelius with Alva Myrdal
 Dispensario Antituberculoso, Barcelona, by Josep Lluís Sert
 An-Nasr Mosque, Nablus, Palestine
 Grand Mosque of Mopti, French Sudan
 El Omrane Mosque, Tunis
 Sacred Heart Cathedral, New Delhi, India, designed by Henry Medd
 Church of Our Lady and the First Martyrs, Heaton, West Yorkshire, England, designed by J. H. Langtry-Langton
 Gothenburg Concert Hall, Sweden, designed by Nils Einar Ericsson
 Vyborg Library, Finland, designed by Alvar Aalto
 Gemeentemuseum Den Haag, Netherlands, designed by Hendrik Petrus Berlage

Exhibitions 
Opened to the public April 19 - Industrial arts exposition at the Forum at Rockefeller Center in New York City; where models and plans for Frank Lloyd Wright's proposed Broadacre City were displayed for the first time.

Awards
 RIBA Royal Gold Medal – Willem Marinus Dudok.
 Grand Prix de Rome, architecture – Paul Domenc.

Births

 March 3 – Corinne Bennett, née Wilson, English conservation architect (died 2010)
 May 7 – Michael Hopkins, English architect
 June 1 – Norman Foster, English architect, head of international design practice Foster and Partners
 November 20 – Imre Makovecz, Hungarian architect (died 2011)
 October 27 – Giorgio Grassi, Italian architect
 October 31 – John Melvin, English architect

Deaths
 March 27 – Francis Rattenbury, English architect, worked chiefly in Canada (born 1867; murdered)
 April 5 – Basil Champneys, English architect and author (born 1842)
 July 6 – Claude Ferrier, British Art Deco architect (born 1879)
 July 7 – George W. Keller, American architect and engineer (born 1842)

References